Ogrodzona may refer to the following villages in Poland:
 Ogrodzona, Łęczyca County in Łódź Voivodeship (central Poland)
 Ogrodzona, Piotrków County in Łódź Voivodeship (central Poland)
 Ogrodzona, Silesian Voivodeship (south Poland)